Murtala Muhammed International Airport (MMIA)  is an international airport located in Ikeja, Lagos State, Nigeria, and is the major airport serving the entire state. The airport was initially built during World War II and is named after Murtala Muhammed (1938–1976), the fourth military ruler of Nigeria.

History

The airport was built during World War II. West African Airways Corporation was formed in 1947 and had its main base at Ikeja. De Havilland Doves were initially operated on WAACs Nigerian internal routes then West African services. Larger Douglas Dakotas were added to the Ikeja-based fleet from 1957.

Originally known as Lagos International Airport, it was renamed in the mid 1970s, during construction of the new international terminal, after a former Nigerian military head of state Murtala Muhammed. The international terminal was modeled after Amsterdam Airport Schiphol. The new terminal opened officially on 15 March 1979. It is the main base for Nigeria's largest airline, Air Peace, as well as for several other Nigerian airlines.

Murtala Muhammed International Airport consists of an international and a domestic terminal, located about one kilometre from each other. Both terminals share the same runways. This domestic terminal used to be the old Ikeja Airport. International operations moved to the new international airport when it was ready while domestic operations moved to the Ikeja Airport, which became the domestic airport. The domestic operations were relocated to the old Lagos domestic terminal in 2000 after a fire. A new domestic privately funded terminal known as MMA2 has been constructed and was commissioned on 7 April 2007.

During the late 1980s and 1990s, the international terminal had a reputation of being dangerous. From 1992 through 2000, the US Federal Aviation Administration (FAA) posted warning signs in all US international airports advising travelers that security conditions at Lagos Airport did not meet ICAO minimum standards. In 1993, the FAA suspended air service between Lagos and the United States. The decision affected Nigeria Airways and American Trans Air. During this period, security at LOS continued to be a serious problem. Travelers arriving in Lagos were harassed both inside and outside of the airport terminal by criminals. Airport staff contributed to its reputation. Immigration officers required bribes before stamping passports, while customs agents demanded payment for nonexistent fees. In addition, several jet airplanes were attacked by criminals who stopped planes taxiing to and from the terminal and robbed their cargo holds.

Following Olusegun Obasanjo's democratic election in 1999, the security situation at Lagos began to improve. Airport police instituted a "shoot on sight" policy for anyone found in the secure areas around runways and taxiways, stopping further airplane robberies. Police secured the inside of the terminal and the arrival areas outside. The FAA ended its suspension of direct flights to Nigeria in 2001 in recognition of these security improvements. Through its joint venture with Nigeria Airways, South African Airways (SAA) inaugurated a flight from Johannesburg to New York via Lagos in February 2001. The airline reserved roughly a third of the seats on the Boeing 747 for Nigeria Airways. However, SAA terminated the service the following March, stating that it was unprofitable. The company added that in an attempt to increase passenger counts, they had tried to convince Nigeria Airways to reduce their seat allotment, but the latter refused. One month later, Nigeria Airways began its own route to New York with a leased Boeing 747. Nevertheless, the lessor seized the plane in January 2003 because Nigeria Airways was not meeting its financial obligations. In July 2006, North American Airlines launched nonstop service to New York using Boeing 767s.

By 2010, the FAA had granted the airport its highest safety rating. That year, the airport served 6,273,545 passengers.

Recent years have seen substantial improvements at Murtala Muhammed International Airport. Malfunctioning and non-operational infrastructures such as air conditioning and luggage belts have been repaired. The entire airport has been cleaned, and many new restaurants and duty-free stores have opened. Bilateral Air Services Agreements signed between Nigeria and other countries are being revived and new ones signed. These agreements have seen the likes of Emirates, Ocean Air, Delta and China Southern Airlines express interest and receive landing rights to Nigeria's largest international airport.

On 6 September 2012, then Minister of Aviation, Stella Oduah, announced that the Federal Government of Nigeria approved a N106 billion loan from the Exim Bank of China to construct 5 new international terminals, including a passenger terminal in Murtala Muhammed International Airport. Construction began in late 2013, and the new international terminal was commissioned by President Muhammadu Buhari on 22 March 2022. The new terminal has the capacity to process 14 million passengers annually.

Airlines and destinations

Passenger

Cargo

Other facilities
The airport includes the headquarters of the Federal Airports Authority of Nigeria. It also houses the head office of the Nigerian Civil Aviation Authority, formerly just its Lagos office; and the head office of the Accident Investigation Bureau. The Lagos office of the Nigerian Civil Aviation Authority is located in Aviation House on the grounds of the airport.

Arik Air's head office is in the Arik Air Aviation Center on the grounds of the airport. Aero Contractors has its head office in the Private Terminal of the Domestic Wing at Murtala Muhammed International Airport.

At one time Nigeria Airways had its head office in Airways House on the airport property. Prior to its disestablishment Afrijet Airlines had its head office in the NAHCO Building on the grounds of the airport.

Statistics 
These data show number of passengers movements into the airport, according to the Federal Airports Authority of Nigeria's Aviation Sector Summary Reports.

Accidents and incidents
 On 20 November 1969, Nigeria Airways Flight 825 crashed while on approach to Murtala Muhammed International Airport. All 87 passengers and crew on board were killed.
 Early in 1981, a Douglas C-47B of Arax Airlines (registration 5N-ARA) was damaged beyond repair in an accident and was subsequently reduced to spares.
 On 26 September 1992, a Nigerian Air Force C-130 Hercules crashed three minutes after take-off in the nearby Ejigbo canal. Three engines failed, high take-off weight. All 158 people on board were killed.
 On 7 November 1996, ADC Airlines Flight 86, a Boeing 727-231 was approaching the airport whilst avoiding a potential collision. The 727 pilots took evasive action but overcompensated: within sixteen seconds the plane was flying upside down approaching Mach 1. The inverted aircraft disintegrated on impact, near Ejirin, killing all 144 passengers and crew.
 On 22 October 2005, Bellview Airlines Flight 210, bound for Abuja, crashed after takeoff, killing all 117 people on board.
 On 3 June 2012, Dana Air Flight 992 crashed in close proximity of the airport. The plane, a McDonnell Douglas MD-83, is reported to have banked sharply prior to attempting to land at LOS, subsequently crashing in the nearby residential area of Agege, killing all 153 passengers and crew on board and six others on the ground.
 On 3 October 2013, Associated Aviation Flight 361 crashed shortly after takeoff. The plane was an Embraer EMB 120 Brasilia. 16 people died and 4 people survived the incident.
 On 13 February 2018, Delta Air Lines Flight 55 en route to Hartsfield–Jackson Atlanta International Airport in Atlanta, Georgia, suffered a fire, which was caught in the left hand engine. The Airbus A330-223 aircraft stopped its climb at 2,000 feet and activated the fire suppression, returning to Lagos for a safe landing about 8 minutes after departure. The aircraft was evacuated, 5 people received minor injuries as result of the evacuation.
 On 15 May 2019, an Air Peace Boeing 737 from Port Harcourt to Lagos suffered a hard landing on runway 18R that resulted in damage to the engine pod and the landing gear. The aircraft was grounded, although no injuries were reported.
 On 16 February 2021, an Azman Air Boeing 737 from Abuja to Lagos blew a number of main tyres upon landing on runway 18R. The aircraft was disabled and the runway closed overnight until the wreckage could be removed.

See also
Admiralty Circle Plaza
Lekki-Epe International Airport – proposed second airport for Lagos
List of airports in Nigeria
Transport in Nigeria

References

Citations

Bibliography

External links

 Murtala Muhammed International Airport, Lagos
 

Airports in Nigeria
Buildings and structures in Lagos State
Airfields of the United States Army Air Forces Air Transport Command in Central and South Africa
Airfields of the United States Army Air Forces
World War II airfields in Nigeria
Airports in Lagos
1940s establishments in Nigeria
Airports in Yorubaland